Williamson Valley is a valley in the Gabilan Range in San Benito County, California.

References

Valleys of San Benito County, California